The University of Queensland Business School is the business school of the University of Queensland, located in Brisbane, Australia. There are seven areas of research expertise across UQ Business School: Accounting, Business Information Systems, Finance, Management, Marketing, Strategy and Tourism.

The school began teaching its MBA program in 1972, the very first to be offered in Queensland. It became the first business school in Australia to meet the standards of the accrediting bodies – the US-based AACSB International and Europe's EQUIS.

The Economist has ranked UQ Business School as 1st worldwide for student quality, the UQ Business School MBA program also ranked 1st in Queensland and 3rd overall in Australia in 2021.

In addition, along with Faculty of Business, Economics & Law, UQ Business School collaborates with Mahidol University International College and The Chinese University of Hong Kong to introduce Hospitality Management Program, exclusively available to its Bachelor of International and Tourism Management students.

History
UQ Business School's origins date back to 1926 when the University of Queensland first began to offer accounting degrees. The Department of Accountancy was set up in 1961, and later became the School of Commerce. Management education began in 1972, when the first MBA students enrolled.

The school was renamed the Department of Business Administration and later became School of Management in 1984.

UQ Business School was formed in 2002 with the merger of the Schools of Commerce and Management, and two years later it expanded further when it merged with the Technology and Innovation Management Centre (TIMC).

UQ Business School was the first business school in Australia to gain dual accreditation from AACSB International and EQUIS – the most prestigious standards a business school can achieve.

Campuses 
UQ Business School operates over two sites. Most of the school's staff are located at the St Lucia campus, a 114-acre site located seven miles from the centre of Brisbane within a bend in the Brisbane River.

UQ Business School Brisbane City (UQ Brisbane City), which opened in 2004, is situated in Brisbane's central business district and is home to the school's MBA program and Executive Education courses. This learning and conference centre won the Queensland Architecture Award (Interiors) in 2005.

Rankings and awards
 5th ranked MBA program in Asia-Pacific in The Economist 2021 Full-time MBA ranking 
 47th ranked MBA program in the world in The Economist 2021 Full-time MBA ranking 
 8th ranked MBA business school in Australia in the Financial Review Boss 2019
 GMAA Five Star rating of MBA program for the ninth consecutive year
 The Australian Research Council's ERA (The Excellence in Research for Australia) rated UQ Business School's research above or well above world standard in all categories (banking, finance, investment, business and management)
 47th ranked business school in the world in the Financial Times executive education open 2011
 Martie-Louise Verreynne, Stewart Gow and Clint Ramsay, awarded by the Australian Teaching and Learning Council(ATLC)

Programs
Degree offerings include undergraduate, postgraduate coursework and postgraduate research programs in business, commerce, and management. Executive education programs address a wide range of contemporary business issues.

Undergraduate programs
 Bachelor of Business Management 
 Bachelor of Commerce 
 Bachelor of Tourism, Hospitality and Event Management
 Bachelor of Advanced Business (Honours)
 Bachelor of Advanced Finance and Economics (Honours)

Postgraduate programs
 Master of Business Administration (MBA)
 Master of Business Analytics
 Master of Entrepreneurship and Innovation
 Master of Leadership in Service Innovation
 Master of Tourism, Hotel and Event Management
 Honours programs
 Master of Commerce 
 Master of Global Management
 Master of Business
 Master of Cyber Security (Leadership major)
 PhD

References

External links
 UQ Business School website
 The University of Queensland website

Queensland
Educational institutions established in 2002
Business School
2002 establishments in Australia